The Adventures of Ibn Battuta is a 2010 Malaysian 13 part historical animated series which was aired in TV2. The series was based on the biography of medieval world traveller Ibn Battuta, who travelled more than 17 countries before and after his Hajj pilgrimage. The series was developed by the Multimedia Development Corporation of Malaysia (MDeC).

See also
 List of Islamic films
 List of animated Islamic films

References

Islamic animated films
Malaysian animated television series
Television series about Islam